Kleinschnittger was a German company that between 1950 and 1957 produced microcars. It was very fuel efficient and consumed less than 3 litres per 100 km (~.79 US gal per 60 mi). The body was in aluminium.

The F250 was fitted with a 250 cc engine from ILO giving .

It is alleged that it was also made in Belgium under the name Kleinstwagen and in the Netherlands as the Alco.

Microcars
Defunct motor vehicle manufacturers of Germany